Al-Risalah al-Fiqhiyyah is a Aqidah and Maliki fiqh book written by Ibn Abi Zayd al-Qayrawani (922 – 996 CE) for learning Islam in North Africa.

Presentation
The book “Ar-Risala” is a Mukhtasar in Maliki fiqh, written by Imam Abu Muhammad Abdullah Ibn Abi Zayd al-Qayrawani, who was nicknamed “Malik al-Saghir” and Sheikh of the Malikis in the Maghreb, on the suggestion of his student Sheikh Mahrez bin Khalaf al-Bakri al-Tunusi al-Maliki (951 - 1022 CE).

In this regard, Imam Ibn Abi Zaid said, addressing Sheikh Mahrez:

The motive for Sheikh Mehrez’s suggestion was what Imam Ibn Abi Zayd mentioned in his speech to him also:

Objectives
Al-Risalah, as is evident from the words of Ibn Abi Zaid, is a book for Islamic and jurisprudential education, that is, a textbook intended for talibes and murids with modern expression.

Al-Qayrawani himself confirms this in the epilogue of the Risala when he said:

Contents
Imam al-Qayrawani divided his book "The Risalah" into two parts:
 Issues of Aqidah: Al-Qayrawani devoted a whole chapter to them, which he called: "The chapter on what the tongues utter and believe is the duty of religious matters" where he gathered one hundred Aqidahs.
 Issues of Fiqh, arranged by Ibn Abi Zaid on forty-four chapters other than the chapter related to Aqidahs, including chapters related to the pillars of religion such as prayer, zakat, Hajj and fasting, and related rulings, and chapters related to jihad, faith and vows, marriage and what follows it, sales and wills, and others.

References

Islamic texts
Ash'ari literature
Books about Islamic jurisprudence
10th-century Arabic books